Elections to Havant Borough Council took place on 6 May 2021 as part of the 2021 United Kingdom local elections. They took place at the same time as the elections for Hampshire County Council and the Hampshire Police and Crime Commissioner.

Background 
In the previous election, the Conservative Party successfully held all 11 seats up for election, albeit with an overall slightly reduced vote percentage. The statement of persons nominated was published on Friday 9 April 2021.

Result summary

Ward results

Source: Havant Borough Council

Barncroft

Battins 
The incumbent Malc Carpenter, previously of UKIP, stood as an independent.

Bedhampton

Bondfields

Cowplain 
Labour did not stand a candidate in this ward, unlike the previous election, when they came second with 13.7% of the vote.

Emsworth

Hart Plain 
The Green Party did not stand a candidate in this ward, unlike the previous election, when they came fourth with 7.6% of the vote.

Hayling East 
UKIP did not stand a candidate in this ward, unlike the previous election, when they came third with 10.6% of the vote.

Hayling West

Purbrook

St. Faith's

Stakes

Warren Park 
UKIP, the incumbent party, did not stand a candidate in this ward; in the 2019 election, the UKIP candidate came joint third with 13.7% of the vote.

Waterloo

References 

Havant
2021
2020s in Hampshire